Per Bredesen (22 December 1930 – 3 October 2022) was a Norwegian footballer. He played as an inside forward for a number of Italian clubs, and was one of the first Norwegian footballers to achieve success in a foreign league.

Club career
Bredesen began his career at his hometown team Ørn Horten in 1947 – only 16 years old, and quickly established himself as one of the league's most talented players.

In 1952, Bredesen became a professional when he was signed by Italian side Lazio. Because the Norwegian FA at the time allowed only amateur players to play for the national team, this move also ended Bredesen's international career.

Bredesen played three years at Lazio, and later played for Udinese, AC Milan, Bari and Messina. In 1957, as a member of Milan, he became the first – and to this date, the only – Norwegian to win the Scudetto. Overall, Bredesen played 214 matches in Italian football and scored 50 goals. In 1961 he left Italy and moved back to Norway, where he rejoined Ørn Horten. He played his last match for Ørn-Horten in 1969.

International career
Bredesen made his international debut against Yugoslavia as an 18-year-old in 1949, and marked the event by scoring a fine goal. Overall, Bredesen won 18 caps and scored seven goals for Norway. He was not selected for Norway after moving abroad, since the Norwegian FA had a strict rule of only using amateur footballers.

Personal life and death
Bredesen died on 3 October 2022, at the age of 91.

Career statistics

Club

International

Scores and results list Norway's goal tally first, score column indicates score after each Bredesen goal.

References

1930 births
2022 deaths
People from Horten
Sportspeople from Vestfold og Telemark
Norwegian footballers
Association football forwards
Norway international footballers
Eliteserien players
Serie A players
Serie B players
FK Ørn-Horten players
S.S. Lazio players
Udinese Calcio players
A.C. Milan players
S.S.C. Bari players
A.C.R. Messina players
Expatriate footballers in Italy
Norwegian expatriate sportspeople in Italy
Norwegian expatriate footballers